"Changes" is a song by French electronic duo Faul & Wad Ad. It was released in November 2013 as a single and reached number-one in Belgium and Germany, while it also reached the top 10 in many other European countries, including the top 3 in the United Kingdom. The song samples the refrain of Australian electronic duo Pnau's song "Baby", which itself was a top 40 hit in Australia. It was used in an advert for the Mercedes C-Class, while the refrain was also used in the video game Gran Turismo 5.

Background
In 2008, Pnau released the track "Baby", sung by a children's choir on their self-titled album. Pnau is a side project of Nick Littlemore of Australian duo Empire of the Sun and of Peter Mayes. The track "Baby" was written by Nick and Sam Littlemore and Peter Mayes and was produced by Sam Littlemore. The song appeared in the 2014 video game Forza Horizon 2, and also appeared in the Bonus collection edition of FIFA 14, also released in 2014.

Track listing
Promo
"Changes" – 3:20
Maxi CD
"Changes" (Radio Mix) – 3:22
"Changes" (Original Mix) – 5:43

Various remixes include "Changes" (Tocadisco's Sunny LA Remix), "Changes" (Stefan Dabruck Remix) and "Changes" (Robin Schulz Remix).
"Changes" was also mixed with Dimitri Vegas and Like Mike's track "Project T", performed in Tomorrowland 2014 in Belgium.

Charts

Weekly charts

Year-end charts

Certifications and sales

Release history

References

2007 songs
2013 singles
Pnau songs
Number-one singles in Germany
Number-one singles in Poland
Number-one singles in Russia
Songs written by Sam Littlemore
Songs written by Nick Littlemore
Songs written by Peter Mayes
Tropical house songs